South Carolina Highway 28 (SC 28) is a  primary state highway in the U.S. state of South Carolina. It consists of two segments of highway signed as east–west but physically traveling north–south from the Georgia state line near Mountain Rest to Beech Island. It is part of a continuous highway separated by a  stretch through Augusta, Georgia.

Route description
SC 28 is part of a three-state highway 28, that totals  from Tapoco, North Carolina to Beech Island, South Carolina. Both Georgia and South Carolina have two sections of Highway 28.

Starting at the Russell Bridge over the Chattooga River, SC 28 starts off as a mountain rural highway, cutting through the Chattooga Ridge at Callas Gap (highest point on route).  After passing Stumphouse Mountain, the curves end as it enters Walhalla.  Once south of Walhalla, the road expands to four-lane (some sections divided), traveling straight to Seneca, then east around Clemson then south towards and around Anderson. Once south of Anderson, it switches into a two-lane rural road through Antreville, around Abbeville, and through McCormick. Along the banks of Lake Strom Thurmond, it eventually crosses over a non-dammed section of the Savannah River near Augusta, Georgia.

SC 28 returns into the state, just southeast of Augusta as a four-lane highway for  before ending in Beech Island at U.S. Route 278 (US 278) / SC 125.

History

Established as an original primary route in 1922, SC 28 went northwest from Allendale, through Ellenton, to Beech Island. In 1928, it was extended southeast, replacing SC 1 from Allendale to Yemassee, then replaced SC 30 to Beaufort.  Seven years later, SC 28 was truncated in Yemassee, replaced by an extension of US 21 to Beaufort.

In 1938, SC 28 was extended northwest, going through Georgia as Georgia State Route 28 to Abbeville (replacing SC 20); then from Abbeville to Anderson (replacing SC 18); and finally from Anderson to the Georgia state line along the Chattooga River (replacing SC 24).

In 1940, SC 28 was extended southeast to Gardens Corner as new primary routing; however, eight years later the extension was dropped, truncated back in Yemassee.

In 1951 or 1952, SC 28 between Beech Island and Allendale was cut off by the establishment of the Savannah River Site.  In 1953, SC 28 was rerouted north around the Savannah River Site (replacing part of SC 781), then along new primary routing south to Barnwell, and then back to Allendale (replacing part of SC 3). Most of the old route became part of SC 125 and SC 641; other sections, that now reside in the Savannah River Site, are off limits.

In 1957 or 1958, two bypass routes were built along SC 28: Seneca and Abbeville; old routes through both cities became SC 28 Business.  In 1959, SC 28 was straightened out east of Seneca, avoiding Newry.  In the early 1960s, two more bypass routes were built along SC 28: Anderson and Pendleton; also, SC 28 was rerouted north and east around Clemson, leaving SC 93.

In 1965, SC 28 was truncated at Beech Island, all points east was replaced by US 278 and SC 68.  In 1973, SC 28 was moved south onto new road between Walhalla and Bounty Land, the old route became "Old Walhalla Highway".

Junction list

Related routes

Seneca business loop

SC 28 Business (SC 28 Bus.) was a business loop that used to follow original SC 28 through the downtown Seneca; it has since been decommissioned.

Clemson business loop

South Carolina Highway 28 Business (SC 28 Bus.) was a business route that existed on the southern edge of Clemson. It was established in 1962 as a renumbering of US 76 Conn./US 123 Conn. from US 76/US 123/SC 28 west of the city to US 76/SC 28 and US 123 Conn. south of the main part of the city. Two years later, it was decommissioned and was redesignated as part of SC 93. Today, it is secondary roads.

Pendleton business loop

South Carolina Highway 28 Business (SC 28 Bus.) is a  business route that follows the original path of SC 28 through downtown Pendleton via Pendleton Road and Mechanic Street.

Anderson business loop

South Carolina Highway 28 Business (SC 28 Bus.) is a  business route that follows the original path of SC 28 through downtown Anderson via Clemson Boulevard and Main Street.

Antreville alternate route

South Carolina Highway 28 Alternate (SC 28 Alt.) was an alternate route that existed entirely along the northeastern edge of Antreville. In 1938, it was established as a renumbering of SC 18 Alt. from SC 184 to SC 28/SC 284. In 1947, it was decommissioned and downgraded to a secondary road, Wall Street.

Abbeville connector

South Carolina 28 Connector (SC 28 Conn.) is an unsigned connector road following North Main Street northwest of downtown Abbeville. It travels  between SC 71 and SC 28 and the unsigned SC 20 Conn. and SC 20 Truck.

South Carolina Highway 28Y (Abbeville)

South Carolina Highway 28Y (SC 28Y) was a connector between SC 72 and SC 28 southwest of Abbeville. In 1957, as part of SC 28 being shifted westward to bypass the city, SC 28Y became part of the mainline's path.

Abbeville business loop

SC 28 Bus. was a business loop used to follow original SC 28 through downtown Abbeville; it has since been decommissioned.

Ellenton alternate route

South Carolina Highway 28 Alternate (SC 28 Alt.) was an alternate route that provided direct access to Ellenton's town center from the mainline. In 1942, it was decommissioned and was redesignated as SC 649. Today, it is part of SRS Route 3.

Hampton alternate route

South Carolina Highway 28 Alternate (SC 28 Alt.) was an alternate route that existed entirely within the city limits of Hampton, when SC 28 existed there. It utilized Magnolia Street and Lee Avenue. In 1947, it was decommissioned and downgraded to secondary roads.

South Carolina Highway 28Y (Yemassee)

South Carolina Highway 28Y (SC 28Y) was a suffixed highway that was established in 1938 as a connection between US 17/US 21 (now US 17 Alt./US 21) and the SC 28 mainline when it used to exist in the town. In 1947, it was decommissioned and was redesignated as part of the mainline's path. Today, it is the easternmost portion of SC 68.

See also

References

External links

 

028
Transportation in Oconee County, South Carolina
Transportation in Pickens County, South Carolina
Transportation in Anderson County, South Carolina
Transportation in Abbeville County, South Carolina
Transportation in McCormick County, South Carolina
Transportation in Aiken County, South Carolina